Frédéric "Fred" Bompard (born 30 December 1962) is a French professional football manager and former player who is the head coach of  club Nîmes. As a player, he was a goalkeeper.

Managerial career

Early career 
While playing for Paris FC in the third division of French football, Bompard simultaneously coached the reserve side of the club. He left the club in 1999. For the 2000–01 season, he would manage fifth-tier .

Dijon 
In 2002, Bompard joined Dijon. He initially took a triple role of B team coach, first team assistant, and goalkeeping coach, but after 2004, he stopped managing the B team. At Dijon, he worked with his colleague Rudi Garcia, with whom he would work with in his four future clubs. Bompard left DFCO in 2007.

Assistant manager roles 
From 2007 to 2019, Bompard worked for several different clubs as assistant manager. He would go by Le Mans, Lille, Roma, and finally, Marseille. In all these roles, he worked under the management of Rudi Garcia.

Guingamp 
In May 2020, Bompard joined Guingamp as assistant manager. However, following the dismissal of Mehmed Baždarević on 1 February 2021, he was appointed interim coach. Bompard was given the full role of manager on 24 February. However, at the end of the season, he and the club decided to end their collaboration.

Nîmes 
On 21 November 2022, Bompard was appointed as head coach of Ligue 2 club Nîmes, after his predecessor Nicolas Usaï was dismissed. He signed a contract until the end of the 2023–24 season. Thibault Giresse was appointed as Bompard's assistant coach.

References

External links 
 
 

1962 births
Living people
People from Asnières-sur-Seine
Footballers from Hauts-de-Seine
French footballers
Association football goalkeepers
AS Corbeil-Essonnes (football) players
Évry FC players
Stade de Reims players
Racing Besançon players
Paris FC players
French Division 3 (1971–1993) players
French Division 4 (1978–1993) players
Ligue 2 players
Division d'Honneur players
Championnat National players
French football managers
Association football goalkeeping coaches
Association football player-managers
Dijon FCO managers
Lille OSC non-playing staff
Olympique de Marseille non-playing staff
A.S. Roma non-playing staff
En Avant Guingamp managers
Ligue 2 managers
French expatriate football managers
French expatriate sportspeople in Italy
Expatriate football managers in Italy